Valeriano Andrés (1922–2005) was a Spanish film and television actor.

Selected filmography
 I Will Consult Mister Brown (1946)
 Guest of Darkness (1948)
 Night Arrival (1949)
 Neutrality (1949)
 The Duchess of Benameji (1949)
 Agustina of Aragon (1950)
 The Great Galeoto (1951)
 Devil's Roundup (1952)
 Lola the Coalgirl (1952)
 Airport (1953)
 Outstanding (1953)
 The Seducer of Granada (1953)
 Jeromin (1953)
 An Andalusian Gentleman (1954)
 Two Paths (1954)
 The Daughters of Helena (1963)

References

Bibliography 
 Florentino Soria. José María Forqué. Editora Regional de Murcia, 1990.

External links 
 

1922 births
2005 deaths
Spanish male film actors
People from Madrid